Melanie Häfliger (born 29 September 1982) is a Swiss retired ice hockey forward, currently serving as head coach of the Swiss women's national under-18 team and as an assistant coach to the Swiss national women's team.

International career
Häfliger was selected to represent Switzerland in the women's ice hockey tournament at the 2010 Winter Olympics. She played in all five games, scoring one assist.

With the Swiss national team, Häfliger participated in five IIHF Women's World Championships, four in the Top Division and one in Division I. Her first appearance came in 2001.

She ended her playing career in 2013.

Career statistics

International career

References

External links

1982 births
Living people
People from Sursee District
Sportspeople from Lucerne
Swiss women's ice hockey forwards
Swiss ice hockey coaches
Ice hockey players at the 2010 Winter Olympics
Olympic ice hockey players of Switzerland
21st-century Swiss women